Vulture City is a ghost town situated at the site of the defunct Vulture Mine in Maricopa County, Arizona, United States.

Vulture Mine
Vulture Mine was a gold mine which was discovered in 1863. It was the most productive gold mine in the history of Arizona. From 1863 to 1942, the mine produced 340,000 ounces of gold and 260,000 ounces of silver.
The Vulture mine was discovered when Henry Wickenburg,  a prospector from California's gold rush, stumbled upon a quartz deposit containing gold while traveling in Arizona. Wickenburg began mining the outcrop himself.

In 1863, after Henry Wickenburg discovered the Vulture mine, Vulture City, a small mining town, was established in the area. Vulture City's post office was established on October 4, 1880, and Henry Wickenburg was the town's first Post Master. The town had more than five boarding houses and several buildings. The huge Vulture Mine-Assay Office building, built in 1884, still stands today. The town also had cookhouse and mess hall plus stores, saloons and even a school. 
The town once had a population of 5,000 citizens. The town was marked by violence. Eighteen men were hanged on an ironwood tree located by the ruins of Henry Wickenburg's house.

Abandoned Vulture City
After the mine closed, the city was abandoned and its buildings decayed, becoming a "ghost town". The deposit was later sold to Benjamin Phelps, who represented a group of investors that eventually organized under the name of Vulture Mining Company. The mine continued to produce at a decreased level until World War II, when it was permanently closed. The buildings and the Vulture Mine are privately owned. The owner offers a two-hour, dirt path guided walking tour at the historic Vulture mine. The tour offers a glimpse of the olden days through a tour of some of the remaining buildings of Vulture City, the once  booming mining town.

Vulture City and Vulture Mine
The following is a list, which includes a photographic gallery, of some of the remaining structures of historic significance in what once was known as Vulture City. Some of these structures are just mere ruins while others are still standing in fairly good condition. Also included in the gallery are some images of the Vulture Mine.

Further reading
 Jill Parsons, Arizona's Haunted History, Irongate Press;  
 Ghost Towns and Historical Haunts in Arizona  Golden West Publishers;

See also

 Vulture Mountains

References

External links

 Vulture – Ghost Town of the Month at azghosttowns.com

Ghost towns in Arizona
Mining communities in Arizona
Buildings and structures in Maricopa County, Arizona
Former populated places in Maricopa County, Arizona